Ghost Riders is a live performance album by Suicide, recorded in 1981 and released in 1986 by ROIR.

Track listing

Personnel
Adapted from the Ghost Riders liner notes.

Suicide
 Martin Rev – keyboards, drum programming
 Alan Vega – vocals

Production and additional personnel
 Paul Marotta – mastering
 Mari Rev – cover art
 Suicide – production

Release history

References

External links 
 

1986 live albums
Suicide (band) albums
ROIR live albums